Nico Anthony Jones (born 3 February 2002) is a professional footballer who plays as a central defender for  club Brentford. He is a product of the Fulham Academy and began his senior career with Oxford United, before transferring to Brentford in 2021. Born in England, Jones was capped by the Republic of Ireland at under-18 level.

Club career

Early years and Oxford United 
A central defender, Jones began his youth career in the Fulham Academy at U9 level. After eight years with the club, he signed a scholarship deal with Oxford United in 2018. He made three first team appearances late in the 2018–19 season and signed a two-year professional contract, with the option of a further year, in June 2019. Jones made just one senior appearance during the 2019–20 season, albeit a memorable one, when he captained Oxford United to a 4–1 EFL Trophy group stage win over Crawley Town on 12 November 2019. The appearance made him the club's youngest-ever captain.

Jones was thereafter was reduced to making EFL Trophy appearances and spent time away on loan at National League South clubs Oxford City and Havant & Waterlooville during the 2019–20 and 2020–21 seasons. He was released in June 2021, after the club neglected to take up the one-year option on his contract. Jones made eight senior appearances during three seasons at the Kassam Stadium.

Brentford 
On 15 August 2021, Jones transferred to the B team at Premier League club Brentford and signed two-year contract, with the option of a further year, on a free transfer. He was a part of the 2021–22 London Senior Cup-winning squad and scored in the Final victory over Hendon.

International career 
Jones was called into the Republic of Ireland under-18 squad for a friendly tournament in Sweden in September 2019 and he made one appearance, in a 0–0 draw with the hosts. Jones made his maiden under-20 appearance with a start in a non-cap friendly versus the Republic of Ireland amateur team on 22 March 2022.

Career statistics

Honours 
Brentford B

 London Senior Cup: 2021–22

References

External links 

 Nico Jones at brentfordfc.com

2002 births
Living people
English footballers
Oxford United F.C. players
Havant & Waterlooville F.C. players
English Football League players
Association football defenders
Republic of Ireland youth international footballers
Brentford F.C. players
National League (English football) players
Oxford City F.C. players
Footballers from Chelsea, London
Republic of Ireland association footballers